Yeshiva University, a United States private university in New York City, with six campuses in New York and one in Israel, was founded in 1886. It is a research university ranked as 45th in the US among national universities by U.S. News & World Report in 2012.

Foundation and early growth
The Etz Chaim Yeshiva, a cheder-style elementary school, was founded on the Lower East Side of Manhattan in 1886. Prior to its founding, Jewish education in the United States had been limited to supplemental and synagogue affiliated schools. Etz Chaim ("The Tree of Life," a reference to the Torah from the Biblical Book of Proverbs, and a common name for yeshivas and synagogues) was the first yeshiva in America; that is, the first full-time, independent Jewish school focusing on the study of the Talmud. The primary impetus for its establishment was the influx of Jewish immigrants from Eastern Europe that began in the 1880s; the school was established along the lines of the Eastern European yeshivas, which themselves had begun to be established in the early 19th Century. However, the New York school, unlike its European counterparts, also offered some secular education, including classes in English. These were very limited at first, but eventually (partially due to New York State law) became a full co-curriculum, something almost unprecedented in the history of Jewish education.

The graduates of Etz Chaim had no place in the United States to continue their formal Jewish education after they completed elementary school, and some began studying Talmud with Rabbi Moses Matlin in his Lower East Side apartment. Soon, in 1896, this group formally became an advanced yeshiva, covering high school years and beyond. Rabbi Yitzchak Elchanan Spektor, the chief rabbi of Kovno (later the capital of Lithuania), and widely considered the leading rabbi of Eastern Europe at the time, died in that year, and the yeshiva was named in his honor, as Yeshivat Rabbeinu Yitzchak Elchanan ("The Yeshiva of our Rabbi, Isaac Elchanan").  A year after it was founded, the yeshiva was formally chartered by New York State in 1897 as the Rabbi Isaac Elchanan Theological Seminary, which is known to this day by its acronym, RIETS. The first class of three rabbis was ordained in 1903.

Despite its name, RIETS began as a traditional Lithuanian yeshiva, not a rabbinical seminary, with classes focusing only on the traditional subjects of Talmud and Jewish law. However, many of the students desired careers as rabbis, and found themselves in competition with the graduates of the Jewish Theological Seminary, at that time still seen as an Orthodox school (it would later become the flagship institution of the Conservative movement), which, while not stressing the traditional subjects, taught its students practical rabbinics, homiletics, and related subjects, making them more attractive to synagogues seeking rabbis. The students of RIETS struck several times in the mid-1900s, demanding these subjects be taught. The board of directors eventually acceded to their requests, and RIETS continues, to this day, to have the somewhat unusual position of being both a traditional yeshiva, preparing its students for the traditional Orthodox semikha (ordination) by teaching a full curriculum of Talmud and Codes of Law, as well as a rabbinical seminary, teaching various practical rabbinics courses. Rabbinical students may also take courses, depending on their intended field of practice, leading to degrees in Jewish studies, Jewish education, or pastoral social work at other schools of Yeshiva University, while others, including those who intend to teach, focus more intensely on the traditional subjects such as Talmud. In the period following these changes, from 1906–1915, such prominent rabbis as Dr. Phillip Hillel Klein, Moses Zebulon Margolies, and Bernard Levinthal served as RIETS president.

Etz Chaim and RIETS, while separate schools, had a close relationship. There were a number of efforts to unite them, which finally succeeded in 1915, when they merged as the Rabbinical College of America. Both schools had each occupied a few locations on the Lower East Side, and now moved into a new building in the neighborhood. Shortly after the merger, the name reverted, for legal reasons, to RIETS, although the most common name used was simply "The Yeshiva." As a number of new Jewish elementary schools were opening at this time, Etz Chaim, the elementary division of the yeshiva, was phased out of existence over the course of the 1920s.

The first president of the newly merged school was Rabbi Bernard (Dov) Revel. Revel was young – thirty at the time – but already renowned as a scholar; he had been ordained in his teens in Lithuania and received his doctorate in Jewish studies (specifically, the relationship of Karaite Judaism to earlier Jewish groups) from Dropsie College (now merged into the University of Pennsylvania) in Philadelphia. His wife's family worked in the oil industry in Oklahoma, and he spent time managing their interests there as well for some time after he became president of the yeshiva before devoting himself to the latter position full-time.

In 1916, RIETS established the yeshiva's first high school (and the first Jewish high school in the United States), the Talmudic Academy (now known as the Marsha Stern Talmudical Academy). Along with traditional Talmud and other Jewish classes in the morning, MTA (as it is commonly known) taught, and continues to teach, a full curriculum of secular subjects in the afternoon. This not only set the pattern for all Jewish secondary (and even primary) schools that would be founded after it, but was to set the pattern for the Yeshiva as well as it founded new divisions. Later, Yeshiva would establish more high schools, in including the Central Yeshiva for Girls in Brooklyn (the first Jewish high school for girls), as well as another boys' high school in Brooklyn (BTA), and a girls' high school in Manhattan. (High schools, and a higher-level yeshiva, were also founded in Los Angeles, but they are now independent.) In the 1970s, the Brooklyn schools were merged into their Manhattan counterparts, and the girls' school was later moved to Queens, where it remains today.

Later growth
During one of Revel's absences in Oklahoma, Rabbi Meir Bar-Ilan, then head of the American branch of the Mizrachi religious Zionist movement, served as temporary president. He merged into the Yeshiva the Mizrachi's Teachers Institutes for Men and Women. The men's school eventually evolved into the Erna Michael College, today the Isaac Breuer College, an undergraduate men's Jewish studies division of Yeshiva

The women's school was eventually folded into Stern College for Women. In 1922, Rabbi Shlomo Polachek began to teach at RIETS, being recognized as the top Rosh Yeshiva (teacher of Talmud). When he died in 1928, he was succeeded by Rabbi Moshe Soloveichik.

TA provided a college-preparatory education, but there was no college for its graduates to continue their Jewish educations as well. In 1928, the Yeshiva established Yeshiva College, which provides both an upper-level yeshiva education as well as a secular university curriculum, awarding a Bachelor's degree. It was starting at this time that Revel- and, later, other leaders of Yeshiva- began to develop their philosophy of the integration of religious and secular knowledge. Rabbinic education in RIETS, for those who choose it (most of the undergraduate men do not), now continues for a few years past graduation from college, leading to ordination, and continues further for a select few students. The school now became known as "Yeshiva College and RIETS."

Also in the late 1920s, Yeshiva left the Lower East Side and moved to its current location in Washington Heights, in upper Manhattan. The area centered on 185th Street and Amsterdam Avenue continues to be Yeshiva's main campus, containing the central administration offices, the main library, the undergraduate schools for men, the boys' high school, the rabbinical seminary, and other divisions.  The 1928 building, by Charles B. Meyers Associates, is an extravagant Moorish Revival architectural romance of domes, turrets, and towers done in orange stone, copper, brass and ceramic tiles.  It may be the only university campus to have been built in the Moorish revival style, a style widely in use in synagogues from the mid-nineteenth to mid-twentieth century. The Great Depression began at this time, and Yeshiva was faced with numerous financial difficulties, having to shelve its more extensive building plans in order to stay open. (The campus would not really expand until the 1960s.) Yeshiva established its first graduate school, in Jewish studies, in 1936. At this time, Revel began working to bring over from Europe numerous faculty, in both Jewish and secular subjects, in order to save them from the impending Holocaust.

1940s–present

First and second leaders
The graduate school was named in honor of Revel after his death, at the age of 55, in 1940. Shortly after, Moshe Soloveichik died as well; his place was taken by his son, Rabbi Joseph B. Soloveitchik, who would remain the Rosh Yeshiva for over forty years, teaching and ordaining thousands of rabbis.

Revel was succeeded in 1943 by Rabbi Dr. Samuel Belkin, also a European-born scholar, a graduate of Brown University, and a professor of Greek at Yeshiva College. Under Belkin, the institution began to expand greatly. University status was obtained in 1945, and over the following decades, many new schools and divisions were opened. Stern College for Women, providing both an advanced Jewish education and full undergraduate curriculum, was established in the 1950s (its campus is in Midtown Manhattan), as was the Albert Einstein College of Medicine, in the Bronx. Also established, among others, were a graduate school of education and the humanities (now the graduate school of psychology) and a graduate school of the sciences (now focusing on biomedical studies), a school of Jewish music for the training of cantors, and a division providing various services to the Jewish community at large. Belkin set in process the foundation of Cardozo Law School, which opened, in Greenwich Village, shortly after his death.

Diversification

In 1970, in order to comply with laws regarding government aid to sectarian institutions, Yeshiva, in a move that aroused considerable opposition by some, including Rabbi Soloveitchik, officially became a secular university, changing the status of RIETS (the rabbinical seminary), the high schools, and related divisions to "affiliates." However, the two parts of the institution remain very close, both in practice and officially on paper. In addition, the undergraduate schools, part of the officially secular university, continue to require a full course of Judaic studies from their students.  For the majority of male undergraduates, this means the standard Talmudic yeshiva curriculum, essentially an undergraduate school of RIETS, along with various courses in academic Jewish studies.  As a result of this policy, all of the undergraduate students are Jewish, and overwhelmingly Orthodox. Even in its more secular graduate schools, Yeshiva University is identifiably Jewish and Orthodox law is observed: for example, the schools are closed on the Sabbath and Jewish holidays and only kosher food is served.

Partly as a result of this, there is a higher than usual proportion of Orthodox students at these schools, although most students are non-Orthodox or non-Jewish. In addition, there are numerous Jewish-related programs and courses of study – for example, Jewish law classes at Cardozo Law School. On the other hand, conflicts have developed over the years of the exact definition of Yeshiva's educational and religious philosophy, and whether it is skewing too far either in the direction of secularism or fundamentalism, these conflicts often arising as a result of specific actions or events. The institution has thus worked continually to maintain the delicate balance inherent in its existence while advancing in both aspects of its character and synthesizing them.

Third leader
Belkin retired as president in 1975 and was appointed Chancellor. After Belkin died in 1976, Rabbi Norman Lamm was elected third president of Yeshiva University and, at the same time, president and Rosh Yeshiva of RIETS. Lamm was the first American-born president and was a graduate of Yeshiva himself: He received his undergraduate degree in chemistry from Yeshiva College, was ordained by RIETS, and received his doctorate (in Jewish philosophy) from the Revel graduate school. He was, at the time, rabbi in a Manhattan synagogue as well as a professor of philosophy at Yeshiva.

When Lamm took office Yeshiva was facing a serious financial crisis. As a result, some of the schools had to be consolidated or closed. More divisions were added: For example, the Sy Syms School of Business, with divisions for both the undergraduate men and women, was opened in 1988. At this time, many of the undergraduate students began to spend their first year (or more) studying in yeshivot and other schools in Israel, which has become an almost universal practice, and a Joint Israel Program regulating these studies was established to allow them to receive credit for this year at Yeshiva. RIETS also maintains a campus in Jerusalem, and many of the rabbinic students spend a year studying there as well. Over the course of Lamm's tenure, enrollment grew considerably to over 2000 undergraduate students. In addition to its undergraduate schools and affiliates, Yeshiva maintains graduate schools in Jewish studies, Jewish education and administration, social work, psychology, law, and medicine. There are over fifteen schools in total. In addition, numerous joint undergraduate-graduate programs with other schools in the New York area and beyond are maintained. The Yeshiva University Museum, an affiliate of the school, is now one of the components of the Center for Jewish History, located in downtown Manhattan.

Fourth leader
In 2002, following Lamm's retirement, Richard M. Joel was chosen as Yeshiva's fourth president. Joel, a graduate of MTA, holder of a law degree from New York University School of Law and a former dean of Cardozo, was head of Hillel: The Foundation for Jewish Campus Life, which coordinates Jewish activities at universities around the United States. (Yeshiva University has no chapter of Hillel.) However, Joel, unlike his predecessors, is, while an Orthodox Jew, not a rabbi or Jewish scholar but a layman. There was some opposition to his selection at the time from the more religiously conservative elements of the school. Later, there was opposition to Joel's introduction of a new logo and mottos for the school; it was felt that these were an attempt to water down the university's mission of Torah U-Madda, synthesizing religious and worldly wisdom, which is the university's motto and is featured on its seal. However, Joel responded that the logo was meant as a supplement to, not a replacement of, the university seal, and that the new mottos were actually slogans; this controversy has diminished as well.

Joel is also the chief executive officer of RIETS (officially known as Chief Executive), but Rabbi Lamm serves as University Chancellor and Rosh Yeshiva of RIETS. While there has never been an official position of "top Rosh Yeshiva" at YU, and, in practice, there has not been an unofficial holder of this position since the death of Soloveitchik in 1993, Lamm, since his retirement, holds this title.

Under Joel's leadership, Yeshiva University's endowment was invested in high-risk investments, including the funds of Bernard Madoff. Losses of at least $110 million resulted.
In early 2014, Moody's lowered the school's bond rating by five steps to B1, junk bond level. To raise funds and cut costs, Yeshiva University has sold off real estate, and transferred control of the Albert Einstein College of Medicine to Montefiore Medical Center.

Joel has created the Yeshiva University Center for the Jewish Future, folding other programs, both from within and from outside YU, into it.

In December 2012, Joel apologized over allegations that two rabbis at the college's high school campus abused boys there in the late 1970s and early 1980s. Investigations into these allegations by The Jewish Daily Forward and a law firm hired by the university found "multiple instances in which the university either failed to appropriately act to protect the safety of its students or did not respond to the allegations at all." These allegations led to a 380 million dollar lawsuit by former students. The case has since been dismissed.

Fifth leader
Rabbi Dr. Ari Berman began his tenure as Yeshiva University’s fifth president in June 2017.
Dr. Berman has articulated a new business model with investments in key areas such as science and technology, entrepreneurship and innovation, values and leadership and market ready graduates. During his tenure, the university has introduced over 20 new graduate degrees in emerging fields including artificial intelligence, cyber security, physician assistant, biotech management, real estate management, special education, marriage and family therapy, MBA and Masters in Holocaust and Genocide Education. He established new academic centers such as the Emil A. and Jenny Fish Center for Holocaust and Genocide Studies. These efforts have produced  growth in enrollment  as well as in philanthropic gifts including funding for the Shevet Glaubach Center for Career Strategy and Professional Development, the Innovation Lab, new physician assistant and occupational therapy labs as well as state of the art computer science labs. Under his leadership, Yeshiva University has risen 29 places in the U.S. News & World Report.
Dr. Berman is widely published in outlets such as Forbes, Newsweek, and the Wall Street Journal. Dr. Berman graduated with distinction from four of Yeshiva University’s schools. He earned his B.A. from Yeshiva College, his M.A. in Medieval Jewish Philosophy from the Bernard Revel Graduate School of Jewish Studies, and his rabbinical ordination from the Rabbi Isaac Elchanan Theological Seminary (RIETS). His studies also included two years of learning at Yeshivat Har Etzion in Israel, under the tutelage of the seminal Jewish thinker and leader Rabbi Dr. Aharon Lichtenstein. After making aliyah to Israel in 2008, Dr. Berman completed his higher education with a Ph.D. in Jewish Thought at the Hebrew University of Jerusalem, supervised by philosopher  Professor Moshe Halbertal.

References 

Yeshiva University